Symphony No. 0 may refer to:

 Anton Bruckner's Symphony No. 0 (Nullte)
 Anton Bruckner's Symphony in F minor, sometimes called No. 00 (Study Symphony)
 Alfred Schnittke's Symphony No. 0
 Kaikhosru Shapurji Sorabji's Piano Symphony No. 0

See also
 Piano Concerto No. 0 (Beethoven)

000